Carlo Cesare Giovannini (1695 in Parma – 1758) was an Italian painter of the Baroque period.
The great painter
He was the son of Giacomo Giovannini, a Bolognese painter. He moved in 1723 to Bologna and trained with Marcantonio Franceschini. In Gaulandi's Memorie, there is a testament he gave asserting the Raphael painting in Parma was genuine.

References

1695 births
1758 deaths
18th-century Italian painters
Italian male painters
Italian art historians
Painters from Bologna
18th-century Italian male artists